P.C. is a split 7-inch vinyl single by Guttermouth and BHR, released in 1993 by Signal Sound System Records. It is currently out of print. P.C. is both the title of Guttermouth's side of the record and their track. The song was re-recorded for their 1994 album Friendly People.

Track listing
Guttermouth
"P.C." (Guttermouth)
BHR
"Transylvania Slam"
"Rabies"

Personnel

Guttermouth
Mark Adkins - vocals
Scott Sheldon - guitar
Eric "Derek" Davis - guitar
Clint "Cliff" Weinrich - bass
James Nunn - drums

Album information
Record label: Signal Sound System Records

References

Guttermouth EPs
1993 EPs
Split EPs